City Harvest Church or CHC is a pentecostal megachurch located within the Yunnan subzone of Jurong West planning area, Singapore.

Founded in 1989 by Kong Hee, the church officially bases its values on Charismatic and Pentecostal teachings, with emphases on such doctrines as the Great Commandment, the Great Commission and the Cultural Mandate.

City Harvest Church is a congregational member of the National Council of Churches of Singapore. Services are held at its church building in Jurong West and rented hall space at Suntec International Convention Centre.

In 2015, six church leaders and fund or finance managers were found guilty of criminal breach of trust and falsification of accounts. When all six of them appealed against the verdict and sentences, the Appeal Court found them guilty of basic criminal breach of trust and reduced their sentences. The Court also noted that the six were not motivated by personal gain, and no permanent loss was intended or caused to CHC – all the monies were returned to the church with interest.

The church was one of three megachurches to make it to a list of Singapore's 10 largest charities, according to a report by The Straits Times in 2019.

Overview
The Straits Times reported that CHC's congregation size peaked at 33,000 in 2010 before investigations into its leaders began. In 2012, Global Church Network listed CHC as one of the ten largest churches outside of the US. The church reported that it had a congregation size of 15,654 in 2019 and an average weekly viewership of 17,276 for its online services and resources in 2020. As of 2018, the demographics revealed that 45.1% are men, 54.9% are women, 34.1% are married, and 61.9% are single. 55.9% of them are working adults, while most of the rest are serving the military, non-salaried, students, and children.

The church was founded by Kong Hee and his wife Sun Ho on 7 May 1989, and held its first service at Peace Centre. It first functioned as "Ekklesia Ministry," a youth department under the legal covering of Bethany Christian Centre, an Assemblies of God church. On 21 December 1992, City Harvest Church was set up as a society. It was registered under the Charities Act on 16 October 1993.  

From 2002, Kong began to teach on the Cultural Mandate and encourage the church members to excel in the marketplace. On 1 November 2005, Kong withdrew himself from the staff payroll and he now serves the church as an honorary founder/senior pastor. Later, in an investigation leading to trial and conviction, it was revealed that Kong had set up a private fund and diverted over $3 million of tithes and pledges to a 'multi purpose account'. Givers to the account were told this was for the funding of a 'Crossover project'.

Since 1996, CHC’s mandate was to build a “church without walls” – a church that actively engages the local community. Out of this vision, CHC started many initiatives such as a community arm known as City Harvest Community Services Association (CHCSA) in 1997 and the Crossover Project in 2002. CHCSA is currently involved in elderly services, direct social services, patient care services, as well as youth and community projects. In December 2004, CHC was involved in the humanitarian relief work of the Indian Ocean tsunami. The church has since sent aid and disaster relief workers to the 2010 Haiti earthquake.

Controversies

Criminal Breach of Trust

Since the beginning of the 21st century, one of the biggest corruption case on the island revolved around City Harvest Church and founders Kong Hee involving a total of S$50 million of funds mis-use. Six persons from the senior leadership, including its church founder Kong Hee, were convicted of the misuse of millions of dollars of the church's money. The court found that the church's senior leadership had channelled $24 million from CHC's Building Fund into sham bonds in music production company Xtron and glass-maker Firna. The purpose of the restricted Building Fund was specifically for building or investment. They used the money to fund the singing career of Kong's wife Ho Yeow Sun, as part of the Crossover Project, a church mission which they said was to evangelise through Ms Ho's music.  Expenses revealed by court records included a house in Hollywood that cost $28,000 a month in rent; a whole entourage of staff; a $1.9 million paycheck to rapper Wyclef Jean to produce the "China Wine" video; as well as another $500,000 to sweep up her albums when they tanked.

The six appealed the verdict, and on 7 April 2017, the Court of Appeal reduced their sentences by approximately half, based on its finding that “the appellants should only have been convicted of the offence of criminal breach of trust simpliciter under section 406 of the Penal Code”. The judges said it was a situation that involved no personal gain on the part of the six, and that they believed their acts, especially in sham investments would advance the interest of the church.
 
A Criminal Reference filed by the AGC in a bid to reinstate the original convictions was heard by a five-judge Court of Appeal and dismissed on 1 Feb 2018.

Sun Ho scandal
In 2013, a scandal took place involving founding clergy Sun Ho after hackers self-styled 'Messiah' hacked her official website, following which a police report was made by City Harvest Church. Around the same time, a spam-like email is further published on the Internet suggested another self-styled 'Messiah-Two' making allegations regarding Sun Ho. The suspected “Messiah”, James Raj, who had prior drug convictions, was arrested the same year for hacking into website of the Prime Minister’s Office.

S$310 million Suntec investment
On 6 March 2010, City Harvest Church announced that it had purchased a significant stake in Suntec Convention Centre and will be using its facilities for church services, the project will cost an estimated S$310 million, including shares acquisition, renovation and rental costs. Church founder Kong Hee said in a statement that the move "allows [the church] to move from a present expensive rental model to a more financially sustainable ownership model for the long term". However, some brought up the point that as a registered charity, CHC's income – expected to include profits and dividends from space rental and tenant leases in Suntec Singapore in the future – is non-taxable. The church has clarified that the investment is indirect, through a wholly owned subsidiary for the purpose of taxation and separate accounting. Questions surfaced among the public whether religious organisations, which are registered as charities, should be allowed to go into business using what are essentially donor funds.

The Commissioner of Charities (COC) sought clarifications on the transaction. The church stated it was under a non-disclosure agreement which required the details of the transaction to remain confidential, but explained that the investment was made through a holding company that is not a charity organization and does not enjoy tax breaks; and had disclosed details of the deal to the COC as well as the Urban Redevelopment Authority upon request. The church also said that there was a "strong and unfounded allegation" floating online that the Management Board and Kong were "deliberately concealing a number of embarrassing facts from its members" with regard to the Suntec investment, saying that the allegation was "furthest from the truth", and later released a notice stating that Charities and foundations often use donor funds to invest and generate sustainable income for their intended causes.

On 21 July 2012, the church announced details of its investment in Suntec Singapore. A total of 39.2% shareholding was acquired at a total cost of $97.75 million.  Public-listed Suntec REIT holds the other 60.8%. The remaining balance in the projected building fund will be used for costs such as equipment, furniture and fittings, periodical shifting costs (due to other events at the venue), committed rentals, optional rentals and refundable rental deposits. In 2013, it was revealed that the church had undertaken a $50m loan with high interests to finance the acquisition of additional shares, as the building fund had largely been exhausted over the years on venue and equipment rentals, while using the Singapore Expo from 2006-2010. If the church is unable to finance the loan, it may in default lose up to 19.2% of its shareholding as part of the loan agreement.

See also
Christianity in Singapore

References

External links

1989 establishments in Singapore
Religious organisations based in Singapore
Pentecostal churches in Asia
Churches in Singapore
Evangelical megachurches in Singapore
Jurong West
Christian organizations established in 1989
Christian denominations established in the 20th century